Sutherland Trail is a trail near Tucson, Arizona. It is part of Catalina State Park located in Oro Valley.  long, the trail connects to other Coronado National Forest trails which extend on to Mount Lemmon at the summit of the Catalina Mountains.

Namesake
Sutherland Trail was named after the Sutherland family that used to inhabit the area in the 1800s.

References

External links
 Official site of Catalina State Park

Santa Catalina Mountains
State parks of Arizona
Geography of Tucson, Arizona
Trails and roads in the American Old West
Tourist attractions in Pima County, Arizona